Tammelin is the surname of the following people:
Bertha Tammelin (1836–1915), Swedish actress
Gabriel Tammelin (1641–1698), Finnish vicar and translator
Lars Tammelin (1669–1733), Finnish mathematician
Lars-Erik Tammelin (1923–1991), Swedish chemist
Matti Tammelin (1926–1998), Finnish boxer

See also
Tammelinn, neighbourhood of Tartu, Estonia

Finnish-language surnames